Ibach is a village in the municipality of Schwyz, itself in the canton of Schwyz in Switzerland.

A Swiss knife manufacturer Victorinox, known for its Swiss Army knives, was founded in Ibach, where it operates to this day.

Sports
FC Ibach is the village's football team.

References

External links
 

Geography of the canton of Schwyz
Villages in Switzerland
Schwyz